Waldbrunn may refer to:

Geography
 Hesse
 Waldbrunn, Hesse, in the district of Limburg-Weilburg, Hesse
 Baden-Württemberg 
 Waldbrunn, Baden-Württemberg, in the Neckar-Odenwald-Kreis, Baden-Württemberg
 Bavaria
 Waldbrunn, Bavaria, in the district of Würzburg, Lower Franconia, Bavaria
 a district of Brunnthal, Munich district, Bavaria

Surname 
 Ernst Waldbrunn (1907 - 1977), Austrian actor, Kabarettist
 Karl Waldbrunner (1906 - 1980), Austrian politician (SPÖ)